Interstate 41 (I-41) is a  north–south Interstate Highway connecting the interchange of I-94 and U.S. Route 41 (US 41), located  south of the Wisconsin–Illinois border at the end of the Tri-State Tollway in metropolitan Chicago, to an interchange with I-43 in metropolitan Green Bay, Wisconsin. The designation travels concurrently with US 41, I-894, US 45, I-43, and sections of I-94 in Wisconsin and Illinois. The route was officially added to the Interstate Highway System on April 7, 2015, and connects Milwaukee and Green Bay with the Fox Cities.

Route description

The highway continues north concurrently with I-94 as part of the North-South Freeway to the Mitchell Interchange in Milwaukee, turns west to run concurrently with I-894 and I-43 as the Airport Freeway to the Hale Interchange (forming a brief wrong-way concurrency with I-43), and turns north to run concurrently as the Zoo Freeway with I-894 and US 45 to the Zoo Interchange, with the US 45 concurrency continuing until the I-41/US 41/US 45 split near Richfield. The Interstate roughly parallels I-43, which runs north–south along Lake Michigan from Milwaukee to Green Bay. I-41 runs through the Fox Valley (including the cities of Fond du Lac, Oshkosh, and Appleton, along with the Fox Cities). At Appleton, I-41 intersects US 10 and State Trunk Highway 441 (WIS 441), the latter of which is a freeway that runs into the city and back to I-41. Further north, I-41 intersects WIS 172 on the south side of Green Bay, before running along the city's west side to its end at the I-43 interchange.

History

The freeway portion of US 41 and US 45 from Milwaukee through the Fox Valley to Green Bay was proposed and designated as an Interstate Highway as part of the 2005 highway funding bill (Safe, Accountable, Flexible, Efficient Transportation Equity Act: A Legacy for Users).

In the initial language of the bill, the route was named Interstate 41, which correlates with the U.S. Highway it parallels and also complies with the Interstate naming guidelines through the American Association of State Highway and Transportation Officials (AASHTO). The final bill omitted the I-41 designation. In 2009, Green Bay officials began a campaign to have US 41 designated as a northern extension of I-55 from its current termination in Chicago, with the alternative being designated as a spur of I-43. At the spring meeting of the Special Committee on U.S. Route Numbers of AASHTO on May 18, 2012, the I-55 designation was discussed by the committee. Coordination would have been required with the Federal Highway Administration (FHWA) and the Illinois Department of Transportation (IDOT) on the I-55 designation.

However, IDOT officials were not interested in signing an extension of I-55 from its Chicago terminus to the state line. Therefore, the Wisconsin Department of Transportation (WisDOT) decided to seek a different designation not requiring the cooperation of their Illinois counterparts. Four designations were proposed by WisDOT and put up for public review: two new primary designations (I-41 and I-47) and two auxiliary designations (I-594 and I-643). At the end of October 2012, WisDOT submitted I-41 to AASHTO for consideration at their fall Special Committee meeting, where it was conditionally approved on November 16, 2012, pending FHWA concurrence. Official approval of I-41 then hinged on weight limit exceptions being approved for the route, which initially passed the United States House of Representatives as H.R. 4745 and awaited a United States Senate vote as S. 2438, but there were later passed in a different bill (H.R. 83) on December 16, 2014. On April 9, 2015, Wisconsin Governor Scott Walker announced that the FHWA had approved I-41 as part of the Interstate Highway System. According to WisDOT, the approval came two days earlier.

WisDOT replaced or modified 3,500 signs before and near September 2015 after coordination with IDOT and the FHWA (signs erected in 2014 and into 2015 before approval of the designation had the I-41 shield obscured until approval). Over the next 5–10 years, shoulders are slated to be rebuilt as older parts of the highway are upgraded. The redesignation to Interstate status also makes the route subject to the Highway Beautification Act, meaning current advertising billboards along the Milwaukee-to-Green Bay portion of the road can no longer be upgraded or enlarged nor can new signs be added.

Exit list

See also

References

External links

 Official US 41 Interstate conversion project page
 Interstate 41 at Interstate-Guide.com

41
41
41
Freeways in the Milwaukee area
Transportation in Lake County, Illinois
Transportation in Kenosha County, Wisconsin
Transportation in Racine County, Wisconsin
Transportation in Milwaukee County, Wisconsin
Transportation in Waukesha County, Wisconsin
Transportation in Washington County, Wisconsin
Transportation in Dodge County, Wisconsin
Transportation in Fond du Lac County, Wisconsin
Transportation in Winnebago County, Wisconsin
Transportation in Outagamie County, Wisconsin
Transportation in Brown County, Wisconsin